This article presents a list of the historical events and publications of Australian literature during 1950.

Books 
 James Aldridge – The Hunter
 Jon Cleary – Just Let Me Be
 Miles Franklin – Prelude to Waking
 Catherine Gaskin
 All Else is Folly
 Dust in the Sunlight
 Frank Hardy – Power Without Glory
 Ion Idriess – The Wild White Man of Badu : A Story of the Coral Sea
 Norman Lindsay – Dust or Polish?
 Philip Lindsay – There is No Escape
 Katharine Susannah Prichard – Winged Seeds
 Nevil Shute – A Town Like Alice
 E. V. Timms – The Beckoning Shore
 Arthur Upfield
 The Bachelors of Broken Hill
 The Widows of Broome

Short stories 
 Nancy Cato – "The Trap"
 Alan Marshall – "Street Scene at Midday"
 John Morrison – "The Children"
 Dal Stivens – "The Batting Wizard from the City"
 Judah Waten
 "Mother"
 "Uncle Isaac"

Children's and Young Adult fiction 
 Ivan Southall – Meet Simon Black
 Ruth C. Williams – Verity of Sydney Town

Poetry 

 David Campbell
 "Ariel"
 "Night Sowing"
 "Who Points the Swallow"
 Nancy Cato
 The Darkened Window : Poems
 "Mallee Farmer"
 C.J. Dennis & Alec H. Chisholm – Selected Verse of C. J. Dennis
 Rosemary Dobson
 "The Bystander"
 "The Raising of the Dead"
 Dorothy Hewett
 "Go Down Red Roses"
 "In Midland Where the Trains Go By"
 "Once I Rode With Clancy..."
 Jack Lindsay – Peace is Our Answer
 Vance Palmer & Margaret Sutherland – Old Australian Bush Ballads
 Roland Robinson
 "The Coal"
 "Deserted Homestead"
 Douglas Stewart – "Helmet Orchid"
 Francis Webb – "Morgan's Country"
 Judith Wright
 "The Cedars"
 "The Cicadas"
 "To a Child"

Drama 
 Kylie Tennant – Tether a Dragon

Biography 
 Don Bradman – Farewell to Cricket
 Nettie Palmer – Henry Handel Richardson : A Study

Non-fiction 
 Arthur Groom – I Saw A Strange Land: Journeys in Central Australia

Awards and honours

Literary

Children's and Young Adult

Poetry

Births 
A list, ordered by date of birth (and, if the date is either unspecified or repeated, ordered alphabetically by surname) of births in 1950 of Australian literary figures, authors of written works or literature-related individuals follows, including year of death.

 16 January – Brian Castro, novelist
 24 March – Andrea Goldsmith, novelist
 26 July – Terry Denton, writer and illustrator
 8 August – Philip Salom, poet and novelist
 1 September – John Forbes, poet (died 1998)
 6 September – Robyn Davidson, travel writer
 27 September – John Marsden, writer and teacher
 14 October – Kate Grenville, novelist
 25 November – Alexis Wright, novelist
 12 December – Louis Nowra, playwright
 22 December – Nick Enright, playwright (died 2003)

Unknown date
 Ian Irvine, novelist
 Peter Pierce, academic, editor and critic
 Andrew Sant, poet
 Carole Wilkinson, writer for children

Deaths 
A list, ordered by date of death (and, if the date is either unspecified or repeated, ordered alphabetically by surname) of deaths in 1950 of Australian literary figures, authors of written works or literature-related individuals follows, including year of birth.

 10 August – Peter Airey, poet and politician (born 1865)
 20 November – Erle Cox, novelist (born 1873)

See also 
 1950 in Australia
 1950 in literature
 1950 in poetry
 List of years in Australian literature
 List of years in literature

References

Literature
Australian literature by year
20th-century Australian literature
1950 in literature